The third season of American show Disney Channel teen sitcom Hannah Montana aired from November 2, 2008 until March 14, 2010. Filming for the season started a day after the 2008 Teen Choice Awards on August 5, 2008. The third season of Hannah Montana focuses on how the characters grow up than the previous seasons. Hannah has grown up into a new look. Different from the previous two seasons, she has shorter hair and an untraditional style which includes a lot of zebra print and unique boots. Oliver and Lilly start dating starting from the episode "What I Don't Like About You". Later, Lilly moves in with the Stewarts. At the end of the season, the Stewarts and Lilly move from Malibu while Oliver prepares to go on tour with a band. This is the last season to be broadcast in Standard Definition.

Production
Disney Channel renewed the series for a third season in April 2008, which was filmed from August 2008 to June 2009.

Casting

The main cast of season 3 remained the same as the previous season. Hayley Chase, Romi Dames, David Koechner, and Cody Linley all reprised their roles as Joannie, Traci Van Horn, Uncle Earl, and Jake Ryan, respectively, in at least one episode. Recurring character from the second season Mikayla, played by Selena Gomez, did not make an appearance in any episode of this season. Also, Roxy Roker, played by Frances Callier, was omitted despite an episode in season 2 emphasizing her importance to Miley/Hannah after working for the president and a major part in the season 2 finale, "We're All on This Date Together". Aunt Dolly, played by Dolly Parton, also makes no appearances in this season. This is the final season where Mitchel Musso is a regular cast member.

Music
The new version of "The Best of Both Worlds" was used both for the movie as well as for the opening sequence, and was sung at the Hannah Montana season 3 concert in 2008. This version is extended to 59 seconds. The full version is featured on the Hannah Montana: The Movie soundtrack but is not featured on the Hannah Montana 3 soundtrack.

Episodes

References

General references 
 
 

 
2008 American television seasons
2009 American television seasons
2010 American television seasons